Richard Teberio (born 17 October 1971) is a retired Swedish football striker.

References

1971 births
Living people
Swedish footballers
Nybergsund IL players
Kalmar FF players
Degerfors IF players
FC Andorra players
Assyriska FF players
GNK Dinamo Zagreb players
Association football forwards
FC Inter Turku players
Footballers from Gothenburg